Maria "Mia" Boman (born  in Sveg, Sweden as Maria "Mia" Zackrisson) is a Swedish curler and curling coach.

As a coach of Swedish wheelchair curling team she participated in 2018 Winter Paralympics.

Teams

Record as a coach of national teams

References

External links

Living people
1975 births
People from Härjedalen
Swedish female curlers
Swedish curling champions
Swedish curling coaches